HD 121228 is a blue supergiant star located in the constellation Centaurus. The star is noted for its close visual proximity to the planetary nebula SuWt 2.

References

See also
Zeta Persei - Same spectral class

121228
068034
B-type supergiants
Centaurus (constellation)
Durchmusterung objects